The Saint-Denis River (in French: rivière Saint-Denis) is a tributary of the south-eastern shore of the Kamouraska River, which flows on the south shore of the St. Lawrence river two km to the east of the village center of Kamouraska.

The Saint-Denis river flows on the Côte-du-Sud in the municipalities of Saint-Gabriel-Lalemant, Mont-Carmel and Saint-Bruno-de-Kamouraska, in the Kamouraska Regional County Municipality, in the administrative region of Bas-Saint-Laurent, in province of Quebec, in Canada.

Geography 
Drawing its source from a marsh area in Saint-Gabriel-Lalemant, near the limit of Mont-Carmel, this watercourse generally flows towards the northeast.

  northward, to the southern limit of the municipality of Mont-Carmel;
  towards the northeast in Mont-Carmel collecting the waters of Anctil brook, up to the route 287 bridge, either between the localities "Grand Bras" and "Bayonne";
  northeasterly, up to the limit of Saint-Bruno-de-Kamouraska;
  north-east, to the Petit-Moulin road bridge which crosses the village of Saint-Bruno-de-Kamouraska;
  towards the north-west collecting the water from the Bouteillerie River, the Pelletier stream, the Marcel-Dionne stream, the Tardif water, from the Labrie stream, from the Ferré stream, to the Petit-Moulin road, which it crosses again;
  westward, curving southward, to its confluence.

Toponymy 
The toponym "Saint-Denis river" is derived from the name of the municipality of the parish of Saint-Denis-De La Bouteillerie located further west, on the south coast of St. Lawrence River. The river tributary of the Bouteillerie is also derived from the name of this parish.

On the map of the township of Woodbridge (1882), the Saint-Denis river is designated the Plate river, characterizing its topographic profile with a low drop. Toponymic variant: rivière de Bayonne and Le Grand Bras.

The toponym "rivière Saint-Denis" was formalized on December 5, 1968, by the Commission de toponymie du Québec.

See also 

 List of rivers of Quebec

References 

Rivers of Bas-Saint-Laurent
Kamouraska Regional County Municipality